Marvin's Room is a 1996 American drama film directed by Jerry Zaks. The script was written by John Guare and based on the play of the same name by Scott McPherson, who died in 1992. McPherson had completed a screenplay for a film version before he died; however Guare was hired to update it when the film eventually started production years later.

It stars Meryl Streep, Leonardo DiCaprio, Diane Keaton, Robert De Niro, Hume Cronyn, Gwen Verdon, Hal Scardino and Dan Hedaya. Original music for the film was composed by Rachel Portman. Carly Simon wrote and performed the theme song "Two Little Sisters", with Meryl Streep adding background vocals.

Plot
Marvin, a man who had a stroke 20 years ago, is left incapacitated and bed-ridden. He has been cared for by his daughter Bessie in their Florida home, and ignored by his other daughter, Lee, who moved to Ohio with her husband 20 years ago and has never contacted her family.

Now, however, Bessie's doctor has informed her that she has leukemia (the same disease her and Lee's mother died from in their youth) and needs a bone marrow transplant and she turns to her sister for help.  Lee, in turn, turns to her 10-year-old son Charlie and 17-year-old teenage son Hank, the latter of whom has been committed to a mental institution for setting fire to his mother's house. However, the rebellious Hank says he won't submit himself to be tested for a match.

Nevertheless, they all travel down to stay with Bessie. When Lee finds that she may have to take over her father's care, she at first begins shopping around for nursing homes, fearing that she'll have to uproot her life. Eventually, however, the estranged family grows close and Hank agrees to get tested.

As Bessie progressively seems to get worse, and testing shows the boys are not a match as bone marrow donors, Lee comes to terms that it is now her turn to take care of her family. The film closes on Lee familiarizing herself with her father's medication, as she walks into his room with his lunch, overlooking Bessie flashing sunlight off the mirror that makes Marvin smile.

Cast

Reception
The film holds an 84% approval rating on review aggregator Rotten Tomatoes based on 50 reviews and an average rating of 6.7/10. The website's critical consensus reads, "Marvin's Room rises above the pack of dysfunctional family dramas thanks to an impeccable cast that includes Meryl Streep, Diane Keaton, and Leonardo DiCaprio." Metacritic gave the film a score of 68 out of 100 based on 20 critical reviews, indicating "generally favorable reviews".

Accolades

Further reading
 Marvin's Room Screen Adaptation: A Scriptwriting Handbook, by Kenneth Portnoy. Published by Focal Press, 1998. .
 
  Grace in Suffering: Marvin's Room Praying the Movies: Daily Meditations from Classic Films, by Edward McNulty, McNulty. Geneva Press, 2001. .

References

External links

 
 
 
 
  Marvin's Room at San Francisco Chronicle.

1996 films
1996 drama films
1996 independent films
American drama films
American independent films
Films about cancer
Films about dysfunctional families
Films about sisters
American films based on plays
Films shot in Florida
Films shot in New Jersey
Films shot in New York City
Films produced by Scott Rudin
Films scored by Rachel Portman
Films about mother–son relationships
Miramax films
1996 directorial debut films
1990s English-language films
1990s American films